The labrum in architecture was a large water-filled vessel or basin with an overhanging lip. Marble labrums were a common feature of Roman thermae.

Examples

See also
 Roman technology

References

Ancient Roman architectural elements